Josip 'Joe' Bačak is an Australian former footballer.

Playing career

Club career
Bačak played for a number of Australian teams, starting with Melbourne Knights FC in the National Soccer League in 1989.

Bačak spent the 2000/2001 season with Greek first division team Ethnikos Asteras, playing four matches.

International career
Bačak played two matches for the Australian under-23 team in January 1996, scoring three goals. His three goals all came in one match against Vanuatu in Adelaide.

References

1973 births
Living people
Australian soccer players
Association football midfielders
National Soccer League (Australia) players
Ethnikos Asteras F.C. players
Melbourne Knights FC players
Sydney Olympic FC players
South Melbourne FC players
Australian expatriate sportspeople in the Netherlands
Expatriate footballers in the Netherlands
Australian people of Croatian descent